Frances Mary Frost (August 3, 1905  – February 11, 1959) was an American poet, novelist, and children's writer. She was the mother of poet Paul Blackburn.

Life
Frost was born in St. Albans, Vermont. She attended Middlebury College from 1923 to 1926 and graduated from the University of Vermont in 1931. At Middlebury she joined Delta Delta Delta.

She married William Gordon Blackburn of St. Albans on April 4, 1926. Paul Blackburn (U.S. poet) was their son. She married Samuel Gaillard Stoney of Charleston, South Carolina, on September 18, 1933.

Frost's work appeared in the New York Herald Tribune, The New Yorker, Harper's, and Saturday Review.

Her papers are held at University of California, San Diego, and Yale University.

Awards
 1929 Yale Younger Poets Award
 1933 O. Henry Award for "The Heart Being Perished"
 1933 Golden Rose Award
 1933/1934 Shelley Memorial Award

Works

Fiction

 Innocent Summer (Farrar & Rinehart, 1936)
 Kate Trimingham (Farrar & Rinehart, 1940)

Poetry

 Hemlock Wall (Yale University Press, 1929); Yale Series of Younger Poets reprint, 1971
 Blue Harvest (Houghton Mifflin, 1931)
 These Acres (Houghton Mifflin, 1932)
 Woman of this Earth (Houghton Mifflin, 1934)
 Road to America (Farrar & Rinehart, 1937)
 Mid-Century (New York: Creative Age Press, 1946),  
 Song For April (circa 1950) Found in an old scrapbook in 2020

Children's books

 Pool in the Meadow: Poems for Young and Old  (Houghton Mifflin, 1933)
 Yoke of Stars (Farrar & Rinehart, 1939)
 Uncle Snowball (Farrar & Rinehart, 1939)
 Village of Glass (Farrar & Rinehart, 1942)
 Christmas in the Woods, illustrated by Aldren A. Watson (Harper & Brothers, 1942) — poem
 The Little Whistler, illus. Roger Duvoisin (Whittlesey, 1949) — poems
 Windy Foot at the County Fair, illus. Lee Townsend (McGraw-Hill, 1947)
 Sleigh Bells for Windy Foot, illus. Townsend (Whittlesey, 1948)
 Christmas is Shaped Like Stars, illus. Garry MacKenzie (T. Y. Crowell, 1948) — poem
 Maple Sugar for Windy Foot, illus. Townsend (McGraw-Hill, 1950)
 Then Came Timothy, illus. Richard Bennett (Whittlesey, 1950)
 Little Fox, illus. Morgan Dennis (Whittlesey, 1952)
 Amahl and the Night Visitors, illus. Duvoisin (Whittlesey, 1952) — narrative adaptation of the 1951 Christmas opera by Gian Carlo Menotti
 Rocket Away!, illus. Paul Galdone (Whittlesey, 1953), foreword by Robert R. Coles, Chairman of the Hayden Planetarium
 Star of Wonder, illus. Galdone (Whittlesey, 1953), by Frost and Robert R. Coles
 The Little Naturalist, illus. Kurt Werth (Whittlesey, 1959) — poems

As editor
 Legends of the United Nations'' (Whittlesey, 1943)

References

External links
Frances Frost Papers. Yale Collection of American Literature, Beinecke Rare Book and Manuscript Library.
 

1905 births
1959 deaths
American children's writers
20th-century American novelists
20th-century American poets
Middlebury College alumni
University of Vermont alumni
Yale Younger Poets winners
People from Franklin County, Vermont
20th-century American women writers
American women children's writers
American women novelists
American women poets